is a UK labour law case concerning the contract of employment.

Facts
Mr O’Brien worked through an employment agency. He moved to an hourly wage. Transco announced it would give better terms to a 70 strong workforce, except Mr O’Brien, who it did not regard as permanent.

Judgment
Pill LJ gave the judgment for the Court of Appeal held that Mr O'Brien was an employee and that there had been a breach of contract.

Longmore LJ and Sir Martin Nourse agreed.

See also

UK labour law
Employment contract in English law
Autoclenz Ltd v Belcher [2011] UKSC 41

Notes

References

United Kingdom labour case law
Court of Appeal (England and Wales) cases
2002 in case law
2002 in British law
United Kingdom employment contract case law